Lindsey Ross (born 1981) is an American fine-art photographer based in Santa Barbara, California, known for creating artwork using the time-intensive wet-plate collodion photographic process. Ross is known for creating ultra large format 32-by-24-inch images on metal (tintypes) and glass (ambrotypes) using one of three Chamonix view cameras that size in existence, keeping alive the collodion method invented in the 1850s.

Life
Born in Columbus, Ohio, Ross was interested in photography from an early age, dressing up as a camera for Halloween at age eight and receiving her own Nikon FM as a gift from her father when she was ten. Ross attended Denison University where she received a Bachelor of Arts in Religion in 2003. After Denison, Ross worked on a cattle ranch in the Chilcotin of British Columbia before moving to Wyoming where she produced photos for a local news outlet. After five years, Ross attended the Brooks Institute where she completed a Master of Fine Arts in Photography.

Work

Since completing her MFA, Ross has been operating a photography studio and traveling the country with her large-format equipment, creating works using older processes. The collodion process Ross employs necessitates the use of a field darkroom when shooting on location and the gear that leaves her studio sometimes includes a 250 lb. camera, 25 lbs. of glass, a 50 lb. film holder, and a 90 lb. cart to move everything. Among the cameras she uses is a Levy process camera from the 1920s originally intended for high-fidelity graphic enlargement and reproduction work.

Ross' subject matter has included yucca plants in Joshua Tree, root vegetables, and snow-covered abandoned mines. Her work has been described as "emotive" and "ethereal"; her landscapes featuring multiple models have been described as "extravagant" and reminiscent of neoclassical paintings.

Ross has sometimes been commissioned to produce work and hold workshops for corporate clients, including Levi's, Red Bull, Universal, and Red Wing. A 2013 short film about her premiered at the Santa Barbara International Film Festival and a follow-up film was selected for the 2017 Banff Mountain Film Festival. In 2019 Ross presented her lecture on The Work of Art in the Age of Mechanical Reproduction by Walter Benjamin at the Robert Capa Contemporary Photography Center in Robert Capa's native Budapest.

Exhibitions

Filmography

References

External links
 
 Lindsey Ross at MutualArt

American portrait photographers
American photojournalists
20th-century American photographers
21st-century American photographers
American women photographers
Artists from Columbus, Ohio
Artists from Santa Barbara, California
Denison University alumni
Brooks Institute alumni
1981 births
Living people
Women photojournalists